Christian Jonas Berglund (born March 12, 1980) is a former professional Swedish ice hockey Left Wing who last played for BIK Karlskoga in Hockeyallsvenskan (Swedish 2nd highest division). He previously played in the National Hockey League (NHL) with the New Jersey Devils and the Florida Panthers.

Playing career
He began his career in Swedish Elite League with Färjestads BK and Swedish World Junior Championship teams. In the 1998 Entry Draft, Berglund became the New Jersey Devils's third choice, being chosen in the second round as the 37th overall pick. He continued to play for Färjestad until 2001, when he signed with the Devils. He played in the minor league Albany River Rats, the Devils' affiliated team, but began playing for the Devils themselves later that season. On 1 March 2004, he and teammate Victor Uchevatov were traded to the Florida Panthers in exchange for Viktor Kozlov.

During the 2004–05 lockout season he went to back Sweden and Färjestad and played with them for one season. In the summer of 2005, he moved to the Swiss club SC Rapperswil-Jona Lakers, a club of the highest Swiss Hockey-League. He enjoyed a 5-year stint in the NLA, before returning again to his original club in Färjestad on a 4-year contract on April 21, 2010. On March 9, 2016, Berglund officially announced his retirement.

Career statistics

Regular season and playoffs

International

References

External links

1980 births
Living people
Albany River Rats players
SC Bern players
BIK Karlskoga players
Bofors IK players
Färjestad BK players
Florida Panthers players
New Jersey Devils players
Sportspeople from Örebro
SC Rapperswil-Jona Lakers players
Swedish expatriate sportspeople in Switzerland
Swedish expatriate ice hockey players in the United States
Swedish ice hockey left wingers
IF Troja/Ljungby players
New Jersey Devils draft picks